USS Mindoro may refer to the following ships of the United States Navy:

, was a gunboat in use in the Philippines from 1899 to 1911
, was a freighter purchased in 1942 and in service until 1945
, was an escort carrier in service from 1945 to 1955

United States Navy ship names